Edwin Bruce Kantar (November 9, 1932 – April 8, 2022) was an American bridge player, winner of two open world championships for national teams (Bermuda Bowls), and prolific writer of bridge books and columns. Kantar was from Santa Monica, California.

Biography
Kantar was born to a Jewish family in Minneapolis, Minnesota. He learned the game at 11 and started teaching it at the age of 17, first to his friends and later at the University of Minnesota, which he attended.

Beside the 1977 and 1979 Bermuda Bowls, Kantar won 15 North American Bridge Championships (NABCs) and was World Bridge Federation (WBF) and American Contract Bridge League (ACBL) Grand Life Master.

Kantar started writing about bridge with an article on notrump bidding in the December 1954 issue of The Bridge World. He wrote more than 35 bridge books and was a regular contributor to the ACBL Bridge Bulletin (with two monthly columns), The Bridge World, and Bridge Today. In a survey of bridge writers and players taken in 1994, Complete Defensive Play was among the top 20 of all-time favorite bridge books. Six of his books have won the American Bridge Teachers' Association (ABTA) award for Best Book of the Year.

Kantar wrote at home in California and lectured on bridge cruises. He also taught in the Los Angeles area as well as lectured several times a year in various resort areas in the U.S. and Canada. When not writing about bridge, Eddie could be found at Venice Beach playing paddle tennis, a sport in which he also garnered several trophies. Eddie was the only person ever to have played in a World Bridge Championship and a World Table Tennis Championship.

Kantar died on April 8, 2022, at the age of 89.

Bridge accomplishments

Honors
 ACBL Hall of Fame, 1996

Awards
 Precision Award (Best Article or Series on a System or Convention) 1981

Wins
 Bermuda Bowl (2) 1977, 1979
 North American Bridge Championships (17)
 Marcus Cup (2) 1960, 1966
 Vanderbilt (3) 1964, 1978, 1988
 Spingold (4) 1961, 1962, 1973, 1978
 Chicago (now Reisinger) (2) 1962, 1965
 Reisinger (2) 1976, 1980
 Grand National Teams (2) 1974, 1976
 North American Men's Swiss Teams (1) 1987
 Life Master Pairs (1) 1983
 United States Bridge Championships (3)
 Open Team Trials (3) 1974, 1977, 1979
 Other notable wins:
 Pan American Invitational Open Teams (1) 1977
 1981 Maccabiah Games (1) 1981

Runners-up
 Bermuda Bowl (1) 1975
 North American Bridge Championships (15)
 Vanderbilt (7) 1961, 1968, 1971, 1973, 1976, 1983, 1989
 Spingold (1) 1991
 Reisinger (3) 1968, 1983, 1992
 Men's Board-a-Match Teams (1) 1970
 Fall National Open Pairs (1) 1962
 Men's Pairs (2) 1962, 1967
 United States Bridge Championships (1)
 Open Team Trials (1) 1973

See also
 Edwin Kantar bibliography

References

External links
 
  – with linked video interviews
 
 Discover Bridge App and Practice booklets at www.will-bridge.us
 List of Kantar's books at Bridge Guys
 

1932 births
2022 deaths
American contract bridge players
Contract bridge writers
Bermuda Bowl players
University of Minnesota alumni
Writers from Minneapolis
Writers from Santa Monica, California
Jewish American writers